is a Japanese writer who formerly held the rank of major in the Japan Ground Self-Defense Force. In 1992, while still employed by the SDF as an instructor of military history, he published an article in Japanese magazine Shūkan Bunshun in which he suggested that a coup was necessary to clean up corruption in the Japanese political establishment. The incident was described as "an extreme source of embarrassment" for the SDF; the public were more amused than outraged by the article, and even some of Yanai's colleagues anonymously referred to him as a "crackpot". In response, the SDF dismissed Yanai from his post. He was the first officer in any branch of the Self Defense Forces to be dismissed in response to his authorship of a newspaper article.

References

1947 births
Japan Ground Self-Defense Force personnel
Living people
Writers from Fukushima Prefecture